Mohamed Issa Liban (born 30 October 1985) is a Djiboutian footballer who plays as a midfielder.

International career

International goals
Scores and results list Djibouti's goal tally first.

References

External links 
 Sergent Liban Mohamed Issa : le surdoué
 

1985 births
Living people

Association football midfielders
Djiboutian footballers
Djibouti international footballers
Djiboutian expatriate footballers
Djiboutian expatriate sportspeople in South Africa
Dynamos F.C. (South Africa) players
Djibouti Premier League players
Expatriate soccer players in South Africa